Michaela Lucie Hanzlíková (born 29 October 1999) is a Czech figure skater. She is the 2017 Czech national champion and has competed in the final segment at two ISU Championships.

Personal life 
Hanzlíková was born on 29 October 1999 in Karlovy Vary, Czech Republic. She has two younger sisters.

Career 
Hanzlíková began learning to skate in 2008. She is coached by Monika Škorničková.

She appeared internationally on the novice level in the 2012–13 and 2013–14 seasons. Her junior international debut came in October 2014 at the Tirnavia Ice Cup.

2015–2016 season 
Making her first Junior Grand Prix (JGP) appearances, Hanzlíková placed 10th in Linz in September 2015 and 8th in Zagreb the following month. In December, she ranked 8th in her senior international debut, at the Santa Claus Cup in Budapest, and became the Czech senior national silver medalist, having finished second to Eliška Březinová at the Four Nationals in Třinec.

2016–2017 season 
Hanzlíková began her season in September 2016 with two 2016–17 JGP events; she  placed 9th in Ostrava and 7th in Ljubljana. At the end of the month, she debuted on the Challenger Series, placing 11th at the 2016 CS Ondrej Nepela Memorial.

In December 2016, Hanzlíková outscored Březinová by seven points to win the Czech senior national title at the Four Nationals in Katowice. She was selected to compete at the 2017 European Championships in Ostrava. She qualified to the free skate by placing 15th in the short program and went on to finish 20th overall.

Programs

Competitive highlights 
CS: Challenger Series; JGP: Junior Grand Prix

References

External links 
 

1999 births
Czech female single skaters
Living people
Sportspeople from Karlovy Vary